Uttar Pradesh State Highway 93 (UP SH 93) starts from Gola (Lakhimpur) and goes to Shahjanhapur and covers a distance of 58.62 km.

See also
 State highway
 State Highway (India)
 Lakhimpur Kheri district
 Dudhwa National Park

References

External links
 Lakhimpur Kheri official website
 State Highway 93 on Google Maps

Transport in Lakhimpur Kheri district
State Highways in Uttar Pradesh